The 13th Pan American Games were held in Winnipeg, Manitoba, Canada from July 23 to August 8, 1999.

Medals

Gold

Men's Kumite (– 70 kg): Anthony Boelbaai

See also
 Netherlands Antilles at the 2000 Summer Olympics

Source: Olmpics 1999
Nations at the 1999 Pan American Games
Pan
1999